Karaosmaniye is a village in the Kemalpaşa District, Artvin Province, Turkey. Its population is 175 (2021).

References

Villages in Kemalpaşa District